Hyacinth Walters (born 15 July 1926) is a Jamaican former sprinter who competed in the 1952 Summer Olympics. In 2011 she celebrated her 85th birthday.

References

1926 births
Living people
Jamaican female sprinters
Olympic athletes of Jamaica
Athletes (track and field) at the 1952 Summer Olympics
Competitors at the 1946 Central American and Caribbean Games
Competitors at the 1950 Central American and Caribbean Games
Competitors at the 1954 Central American and Caribbean Games
Central American and Caribbean Games gold medalists for Jamaica
Central American and Caribbean Games silver medalists for Jamaica
Central American and Caribbean Games bronze medalists for Jamaica
Central American and Caribbean Games medalists in athletics
Olympic female sprinters
20th-century Jamaican women
21st-century Jamaican women